Leptinaria unilamellata is a species of tropical, air-breathing land snail, a terrestrial pulmonate gastropod mollusk in the family Achatinidae.

Distribution 
Leptinaria unilamellata is a widespread species throughout the Caribbean Basin.

The distribution of Leptinaria unilamellata includes:

 West Indies
 Dominica - introduced
 Guadeloupe - introduced
 Martinique - introduced
 other in the Lesser Antilles - introduced
 Central America
 Venezuela
 Peru

Ecology 
It is generally found in damp leaf litter and under rotten logs in Dominica.

It is ovoviviparous species.

References
This article incorporates CC-BY-3.0 text from the reference.

Subulininae
Gastropods described in 1837